Monastery of Beth Abe (literally "house of wood"), is an East Syriac monastery located near the on the Great Zab about 80 km northeast of Nineveh. It was founded by Rabban Jacob of Lashom around 595 AD. The monastery played a major part in Syriac monasticism and was inhabited by several important figures in the Church of the East such as Sahdona, John of Dailam, Shubhalishoʿ, Giwargis II and Abraham II. One monk, Thomas of Marga, wrote a history of the monastery. Another, Bishop David of Kartaw, wrote a series of biographies of holy men known as the Little Paradise.

Abbots
The abbots listed by Thomas of Marga are:
Rabban Jacob of Lashom
John [I] of Beth Garmai (before 628)
Paul
Kam-Isho (during the reign of Ishoyahb III, 649–659)
Beraz-Surin (during the reign of Giwargis I, 661–680)
Rabban Mar Abraham
Bar Sauma (during the reign of Hnanisho I, 686–698)
Gabriel [I] of Shahrizor, called "the Cow" (during the reign of Hnanisho I)
George Bar Sayyadhe of Neshra (during the reign of Hnanisho I)
Sama of Neshra, brother of prec. (during the reign of Hnanisho I)
Nathaniel (during the reign of Hnanisho I)
Selibha the Aramaean (during the reign of Hnanisho I)
Gabriel [II], called "the Little Sparrow"
Joseph [I] of Shahrizor (during the reign of Sliba-zkha, 714–728)
John [II] (during the reign of Sliba-zkha)
Aha (during the reign of Aba II, 741–751)
Ishoyahb of Tella of Birta (during the reign of Aba II)
Cyriacus of Gebhilta (died c. 800)
Shubhhal-Maran
Joseph [II] (died 832)

References

Bibliography

Christian monasteries established in the 6th century